Four Corners is a census-designated place (CDP) in Marion County, Oregon, United States, just outside the city limits of Salem but within the city's urban growth boundary. It is part of the Salem Metropolitan Statistical Area. The population of the CDP was 16,740 at the 2020 census. It is named after the intersection of State Street and Lancaster Drive.

Geography

Climate
This region experiences warm (but not hot) and dry summers, with no average monthly temperatures above .  According to the Köppen Climate Classification system, Four Corners has a warm-summer Mediterranean climate, abbreviated "Csb" on climate maps.

Demographics

As of the census of 2000, there were 13,922 people, 5,088 households, and 3,475 families residing in the CDP. The population density was 5,048.4 people per square mile (1,947.6/km2). There were 5,403 housing units at an average density of 1,959.2/sq mi (755.8/km2). The racial makeup of the CDP was 78.78% White, 1.32% African American, 2.00% Native American, 1.85% Asian, 0.96% Pacific Islander, 11.38% from other races, and 3.71% from two or more races. Hispanic or Latino of any race were 18.05% of the population.

There were 5,088 households, out of which 35.8% had children under the age of 18 living with them, 50.0% were married couples living together, 12.9% had a female householder with no husband present, and 31.7% were non-families. 24.5% of all households were made up of individuals, and 10.5% had someone living alone who was 65 years of age or older. The average household size was 2.73 and the average family size was 3.25.

In the CDP, the population was spread out, with 30.3% under the age of 18, 9.3% from 18 to 24, 28.5% from 25 to 44, 20.2% from 45 to 64, and 11.8% who were 65 years of age or older. The median age was 32 years. For every 100 females, there were 95.0 males. For every 100 females age 18 and over, there were 92.9 males.

The median income for a household in the CDP was $36,335, and the median income for a family was $39,746. Males had a median income of $30,550 versus $25,393 for females. The per capita income for the CDP was $15,672. About 13.4% of families and 15.9% of the population were below the poverty line, including 24.3% of those under age 18 and 8.2% of those age 65 or over.

References

Census-designated places in Oregon
Salem, Oregon metropolitan area
Unincorporated communities in Marion County, Oregon
Census-designated places in Marion County, Oregon
Unincorporated communities in Oregon